The list of ship launches in 1965 includes a chronological list of all ships launched in 1965.


References

Sources

1965
Ship launches